Hatem Ghoula (born 7 June 1973 in Paris, France) is a Tunisian race walker. He won four consecutive African Championships in the 20 kilometres walk from 1996 to 2002. His foremost medal was a 20 km walk bronze at the 2007 World Championships in Athletics. He is also a two-time gold medallist at the All-African Games, having won in 2003 and 2007 (the latter in a Games record time).

He has represented Tunisia at four Olympic Games (1996 to 2008), with his best performance of eleventh place coming in 2004. He competed at the IAAF World Championships in Athletics for eight straight editions from 1993 to 2007 and made his ninth appearance at the 2013 World Championships in Athletics. At the IAAF World Race Walking Cup he has participated on five occasions and came close to a medal in 2006, finishing in fourth place.

He is a two-time gold medallist at the African Race Walking Championships and the Jeux de la Francophonie, and was the champion at the 2004 Arab Games and 2001 Mediterranean Games.

He holds the African records in racewalking for the distance of 20,000 metres on the track and 20 km walk on the road.

International competitions

See also
List of champions of the African Athletics Championships

References

1973 births
Living people
Athletes from Paris
Citizens of Tunisia through descent
Tunisian male racewalkers
French male racewalkers
Olympic athletes of Tunisia
Athletes (track and field) at the 1996 Summer Olympics
Athletes (track and field) at the 2000 Summer Olympics
Athletes (track and field) at the 2004 Summer Olympics
Athletes (track and field) at the 2008 Summer Olympics
World Athletics Championships athletes for Tunisia
World Athletics Championships medalists
African Games gold medalists for Tunisia
African Games medalists in athletics (track and field)
French sportspeople of Tunisian descent
Mediterranean Games gold medalists for Tunisia
Mediterranean Games bronze medalists for Tunisia
Mediterranean Games medalists in athletics
Athletes (track and field) at the 1999 All-Africa Games
Athletes (track and field) at the 2003 All-Africa Games
Athletes (track and field) at the 2007 All-Africa Games
Athletes (track and field) at the 1997 Mediterranean Games
Athletes (track and field) at the 2001 Mediterranean Games
Athletes (track and field) at the 2005 Mediterranean Games
20th-century Tunisian people